UTV Motion Pictures (also known as Disney UTV from 2012-13) was the feature film unit of UTV Software Communications founded by Ronnie Screwvala and Zarina Screwvala in 1996 as UTV Motion Pictures Plc., the film distribution division of UTV Software Communications. It was one of the leading film studios in India and one of the largest production studios in South Asia. The studio's activities spanned creative development, production, marketing, distribution, licensing, merchandising, and worldwide syndication of films in Indian territories. It was also a distribution label of Disney for feature films produced by Walt Disney Studios Motion Pictures in India.

UTV Motion Pictures had a library of domestic regional films and animation productions alongside select international productions with the studio moving into film production in Bollywood, and further expanding in Hollywood in partnership with studios such as 20th Century Studios, Walt Disney Pictures and Sony Pictures. In July 2017, Disney shut down UTV Motion Pictures, shortly after the release of the Action film Jagga Jasoos, and initially planned to focus on its Hollywood films distribution and television and licensing and merchandising businesses through the banner, effectively pulling the plug on its Hindi film production, before completely terminating it in 2019 after its acquisition on 21st Century Fox, which made Fox Star Studios the dominant Disney brand in India.

Film productions and distribution

Films produced by UTV Motion Pictures

UTV Spotboy 
The following films were produced under the UTV Spotboy banner.

Films only distributed

Unreleased/shelved films 
 Hook Ya Crook
 Alibaba Aur 41 Chor
 Peter Gaya Kaam Se
 Shoebite

International films distribution in India

Walt Disney Studios films in India 

UTV's distribution relations with Disney first began when in 2005, Miramax Films, then owned by The Walt Disney Company, sold distribution rights to several films of their catalog in a 10-year deal; however it is currently unknown whether this deal continued even when Miramax was sold to Filmyard Holdings. In December 2008, following their purchase of a majority stake in UTV, The Walt Disney Company, which would later acquire the entirety of UTV Motion Pictures through UTV Software Communications in 2012, handed over exclusive distribution rights to their films in the Indian subcontinent, starting with Walt Disney Pictures' Bedtime Stories. UTV Motion Pictures became the exclusive distributor for all Walt Disney Studios Motion Pictures releases for South Asian territories from 2013 onward. Distribution rights to 20th Century Studios and Searchlight Pictures films continued to be handled by Star Studios until about 2020, when Buena Vista International began releasing the studios' films internationally and thus UTV acquired the distribution rights to their films in the Indian subcontinent.

Non-Disney international films

See also 
 Star Studios
 List of Walt Disney Pictures India films
 List of Walt Disney Pictures films

References

External links 
 UTV Software Communications Ltd.

Indian companies established in 1996
Mass media companies established in 1996
Film distributors of India
Film production companies based in Mumbai
Film studios in Mumbai
Film production companies of India
Former subsidiaries of The Walt Disney Company
Disney production studios
UTV Software Communications
Producers who won the Best Popular Film Providing Wholesome Entertainment National Film Award